Giethoorn is a village in the province of Overijssel, Netherlands with a population of 2,795 in 2020. It is located in the municipality of Steenwijkerland, about 5 km southwest of Steenwijk. As a popular Dutch tourist destination both within Netherlands and abroad, Giethoorn is often referred to as "Dutch Venice" or the "Venice of the Netherlands".

History
Giethoorn used to be a pedestrian precinct, but nowadays exceptions are made. It became locally famous, especially after 1958, when the Dutch film maker Bert Haanstra made his famous comedy Fanfare there. In the old part of the village, there were no roads (though a cycling path was eventually added), and all transport was done by water over one of the many canals. The lakes in Giethoorn were formed by peat digging.

Giethoorn was a separate municipality until 1973, when it became part of Brederwiede, which lost its municipality status in 2001 to merge with Steenwijk.

Tourism
Tourism has an influence on the old traditional town. The village, still only fully accessible by boat, is one of several places commonly known as the Venice of the North or Venice of the Netherlands. Giethoorn has 176 bridges.

Monopoly edition
In 2015, the village of Giethoorn was chosen from 182 contenders across the world to achieve a place on the board of the new international edition of Monopoly. An online campaign led by local Village Marketeer Giethoorn.com resulted in enough votes to obtain spot number 21 on the special edition.

Notable people 
 Jonnie Boer (born 1965), Michelin star winning head chef

References

External links

 Touristic website of Giethoorn
 Official website of Giethoorn (in Dutch)

Articles containing video clips
Car-free zones in Europe
Former municipalities of Overijssel
Populated places in Overijssel
Steenwijkerland